Jonas Dahl (born 26 February 1978 in Randers) is a Danish politician. He was Minister for Taxation in the Cabinet of Helle Thorning-Schmidt from 12 December 2013 until 3 February 2014. He was a member of the Folketing representing the Socialist People's Party from 2007 to 2016.

Political career
Dahl was a member of the regional council of Region of Central Jutland from 2006 to 2007. He was first elected into parliament at the 2007 Danish general election, and reelected in 2011 and 2015. In 2016 he left parliament to become director of a hospital in Randers.

References

External links 
 Biography on the website of the Danish Parliament (Folketinget)

1978 births
Living people
People from Randers
Danish Tax Ministers
Socialist People's Party (Denmark) politicians
Members of the Folketing 2007–2011
Members of the Folketing 2011–2015
Members of the Folketing 2015–2019